The rufous-headed tanager (Hemithraupis ruficapilla) is a species of bird in the family Thraupidae. It is endemic to Brazil.

Its natural habitats are subtropical or tropical moist lowland forest, subtropical or tropical moist montane forest, and heavily degraded former forest.

References

rufous-headed tanager
Birds of the Atlantic Forest
Endemic birds of Brazil
rufous-headed tanager
Taxa named by Louis Jean Pierre Vieillot
Taxonomy articles created by Polbot